Innovative University of Eurasia (Pavlodar, Kazakhstan) is a multi-discipline university in Kazakhstan, offering 57 programs in  Engineering, Economics, Law, Natural Sciences, and Humanities.

History 
 19 Feb 1991 - the first Scientific Industrial Centre (SIC) in the Pavlodar region was founded.
 1994 -  Kazakhstan-Russian University was established.
 1995 - Kazakhstan-Russian University was renamed to the Institute of Economics and Engineering.
 1997 - the Institute of Economics and Engineering was renamed to Pavlodar University.
 2006 - Pavlodar University was renamed to the Innovative University of Eurasia

There are over 8000 students at the university, including 1500 students who hold the state educational grants, grants of foreign entrepreneurs, and grants of Akim of Pavlodar region.  The study language is Kazakh, English, and Russian languages. There are full-time  and part-time programs, and distance learning education.

Organization 
There is a multi-level educational system at the university:
 School-lyceum
 Vocational school
 College
 Bachelor programme
 Master programme
 PhD

At InEU the student can be awarded:
 State Diploma
 International Diploma of Russian, USA, and Germany universities
 Additional professional education (Institute of continuing education, Institute of additional professional education, foreign language courses, information technology courses, business administration courses)

Academic year 
 Full-time programs:  1 year (2 semesters, 15 weeks in each semester)
 1st semester: from September, the 1st  till December, the 15th
 2nd semester: from January, the 18th   till July, the 3rd
 Part-time programs: 1 year (2 semesters, 3 weeks in each semester)

Library 
The scientific library of the university annual accession is 30-35 thousand copies of new publications. The information office of the library has catalogues and card -indexes, an electronic catalogue for fast search, an electronic library and on-line Internet.

There is a delivery desk and five reading rooms. The InEU scientific library is a member of the Association of University Libraries of Kazakhstan, the holder of Soros-Kazakhstan Foundation grant.

Museums and galleries 
There is an ethnical museum of Kazakh culture and university history, and an Art gallery of InEU students' and teachers' works.

Clubs and societies 
In InEU there is an Academy of Culture and Youth Affairs and PR Department. Their main goal is the all-round personality development of the student. There is a choreographic Dance club on the basis of Academy of Culture, taking part in the university and city events.
There is a vocal studio. At the Academy of Culture there are KVN teams, "Kaz InUE" and "Spaun".

Mass-media 
The scientific journal Vestnik of InEU is published at the university. It is included in the list of the editions recommended by the Ministry of Education and Science of the Republic of Kazakhstan for publication of the main statements of the Candidate of Sciences and PhD dissertations.

The university scientists have been received more than 40 patents for inventions.

There is a periodical newspaper named "Znaniye".

Buildings and parks 
InEU campus consisting of five educational buildings, a library complex, computer classes with Internet access, a publishing center, sports halls and sites, a student's cafe, and a hostel. There are parks and squares at the InEU area.

References

2006 establishments in Kazakhstan
Educational institutions established in 2006
Universities in Kazakhstan